St Paul's Church is a 19th-century church in Winlaton, Tyne and Wear, England, dedicated to St Paul.

History
The church was designed by Ignatius Bonomi and consecrated in 1828.

In the 20th century alterations and maintenance work to the church were carried out by Charlewood, Curry, Wilson & Atkinson, architects.

Inside the church there is a memorial plaque dedicated to former pupils of Blaydon Secondary School who died in World War I. The plaque was transferred to the church when the school closed in 1998.

References

External links
St Paul's Church at A Church Near You

Buildings and structures in Gateshead
Church of England church buildings in Tyne and Wear